The 2004–05 Liga Artzit season saw Hapoel Ashkelon win the title and promotion to Liga Leumit alongside runners-up Maccabi Be'er Sheva. Hapoel Majd al-Krum were relegated to Liga Alef, whilst Maccabi Ironi Kiryat Ata, who finished second from bottom, were reprieved after Maccabi Ramat Amidar left the league and merged with Hakoah Ramat Gan.

Final table

References
Israel Third Level 2004/05 RSSSF

Liga Artzit seasons
3
Israel